The First Battle of Katwa occurred between Bengal Subah and Maratha Empire in 1742. The Marathas initially attacked and captured Katwa and Hooghly in Bengal. The Nawab of Bengal Alivardi Khan, using conscripted tribal and peasant levies from Birbhum, responded with a direct attack on the Maratha camp at Katwa from the rear in nightfall and the entire Maratha army was evacuated out of Bengal on 17 September 1742, believing a much larger force had charged them. The Maratha commander Bhaskar Pandit was killed during the attack on the camp.

See also 
 Battle of Burdwan
 Maratha invasions of Bengal
 Second Battle of Katwa

References

Katwa 1742
Katwa
1742 in India
Katwa